Eric Monti (December 6, 1917 – February 1, 2009) was an American professional golfer who played on the PGA Tour in the 1940s, 1950s and 1960s.

Monti was born in Pekin, Illinois. He started caddying at age 6, and was one of six golfing brothers. He turned professional in 1943. He moved to Los Angeles with his wife in the mid-1940s, and began play on the PGA Tour in the late 1940s, winning three times. His best finish in a major championship was T6 at the 1961 U.S. Open.

Like most golfers of his generation, Monti earned his living primarily as a club pro. He initially worked at the Los Angeles Country Club before being hired as an assistant pro to George Fazio at Hillcrest Country Club. In 1955, he became head pro at Hillcrest and developed a reputation as the teacher to the stars. Henry Fonda, Burt Lancaster, Danny Thomas, Dinah Shore, Danny Kaye, and Jack Benny were among the famous Hollywood celebrities he instructed. He worked at Hillcrest for 45 years before retiring in 1990.

Monti died at his home in Laguna Woods, California of prostate cancer at the age of 91. His wife, Evelyn, died in 2006.

Professional wins (9)

PGA Tour wins (3)

PGA Tour playoff record (1–0)

Other wins (6)
1952 Southern California PGA Championship
1953 Northern California Open, Southern California PGA Championship
1956 Southern California PGA Championship
1957 Southern California PGA Championship
1963 Southern California PGA Championship

References

External links

American male golfers
PGA Tour golfers
Golfers from Illinois
Deaths from prostate cancer
People from Pekin, Illinois
Golfers from Los Angeles
Sportspeople from Orange County, California
1917 births
2009 deaths